Frank Dehne (born 14 February 1976 in Berlin) is a volleyball player from Germany, who plays for the National Team. He is nicknamed "Döner" and played as a setter for Galatasaray.

References

  Profile
  Porträt beim DVV
  Bilder vom DVV

1976 births
Living people
Volleyball players from Berlin
German men's volleyball players
Volleyball players at the 2008 Summer Olympics
Olympic volleyball players of Germany
Galatasaray S.K. (men's volleyball) players
21st-century German people